Defensor San Alejandro is a Peruvian football club, playing in the city of Aguaytía, Padre Abad, Ucayali, Peru.

History
In the 2011 Copa Perú, the club classified to the Regional Stage, but was eliminated by Universidad Nacional de Ucayali in the Region III's Group B.

In the 2012 Copa Perú, the club classified to the National Stage, but was eliminated by Alianza Cristiana in the quarterfinals. It was invited to play in the Peruvian Segunda División.

Honours

Regional
Región III: 0
Runner-up (1): 2012

Liga Departamental de Ucayali: 1
Winners (1): 2011, 2017
Runner-up (1): 2012

Liga Provincial de Padre Abad: 1
Winners (2): 2011, 2022
Runner-up (1): 2017

Liga Distrital de Irazola: 1
Winners (1): 2011

See also
List of football clubs in Peru
Peruvian football league system

External links
 La Furia Roja del Cacao

Football clubs in Peru
University and college association football clubs